Teleclus or Teleklos (Greek: Τήλεκλος) was the 8th Agiad dynasty king of Sparta during the eighth century BC. He was the son of King Archelaus and grandson of King Agesilaus I.

Pausanias reports that Teleclus' reign saw the conquest of Amyclae, Pharis and Geranthrae, towns of the Perioeci or "dwellers round about".

Teleclus was killed during a skirmish with the Messanians during a festival at the temple of Artemis Limnatis, an event foreshadowing the First Messenian War.

He was succeeded by his son Alcmenes.

Notes

References
 

8th-century BC rulers
8th-century BC Spartans
Agiad kings of Sparta
Ancient Greeks killed in battle
8th-century BC deaths
Year of birth unknown
Monarchs killed in action